The 2022–23 Brighton & Hove Albion W.F.C. season is the club's 32nd season in existence and their fifth in the Women's Super League, the highest level of the football pyramid. Along with competing in the WSL, the club will also contest two domestic cup competitions: the FA Cup and the League Cup.

On 31 October, Hope Powell stepped down as manager after five years in charge. Assistant manager Amy Merricks was promoted to interim manager. , who had been out of work since leaving Bayern Munich at the conclusion of the 2021–22 Frauen-Bundesliga season in May, was appointed to the role permanently on 28 December. He remained in the role for 65 days until leaving by mutual consent on 6 March 2023. Merricks was reappointed interim manager on the same day.

Squad

Preseason

Competitions

Women's Super League

Results summary

Results by matchday

Results

League table

Women's FA Cup

As a member of the first tier, Brighton will enter the FA Cup in the fourth round proper. In the Fifth round a home tie against Coventry United was confirmed.

FA Women's League Cup

Group stage

Squad statistics

Appearances 

Starting appearances are listed first, followed by substitute appearances after the + symbol where applicable.

|-
! colspan=14 style=background:#dcdcdc; text-align:center|Goalkeepers

|-
! colspan=14 style=background:#dcdcdc; text-align:center|Defenders

|-
! colspan=14   style=background:#dcdcdc; text-align:center|Midfielders  
  

             

|-                                
! colspan=14 style=background:#dcdcdc; text-align:center|Forwards

|}

Goalscorers
As of 19 March 2023

Transfers

Transfers in

Loans in

Transfers out

Loans out

References 

Brighton & Hove Albion W.F.C. seasons
Brighton and Hove Albion